Invader Zim is an American comic book series created by Jhonen Vasquez and published by Oni Press. It serves as an continuation to the animated television series of the same name that originally aired on Nickelodeon.

In February 2015, Oni Press announced that a comic book series based on the show, in collaboration with Jhonen Vasquez and Nickelodeon, was being released as the continuation of the series. Vasquez said about the show: "I'm always confused when people say how much they miss Invader Zim because the show never stopped running in my head, and then I remember everyone else isn't in my head". A pre-issue #0 was released on May 23, 2015 as a zine and foreshadow to the comic book series. The first issue was released on July 8, 2015, launching a monthly run that continued until issue #50.

On February 11, 2020, it was announced that the monthly Invader Zim comic would end with issue #50, released in March 2020, and a new comic series titled Invader Zim Quarterly would begin April 2020, releasing on a quarterly schedule. However, due to comic publishers halting the release of new issues during the COVID-19 pandemic, this was postponed until June 2020. In April 2021, it was announced that the comic series would end with a special one-shot releasing in August 2021.

Additionally, in July 2020, Oni Press launched a new "Best of..." trade paperback collections, which collect a selection of stories from Oni Press's monthly Invader Zim comic series.

Issues

Monthly

Quarterly

Collected editions

Trade paperbacks

Deluxe hardcovers

Reception
Matt Little from Comic Book Resources said, "Invader Zim #1 is a welcome return and an accessible jumping on point for anyone who has heard of it or is interested to learn more. It's an all-ages affair that is entertaining for any reader, as it doesn't speak down to its audience." Marcy Cook from The Mary Sue said, "If you liked the over-the-top nonsense of the show, you're going to enjoy the comic too. The art has that loose stylised look that's very Zim, with the distinctly limited muted colour palette."

According to statistics from Diamond Comic Distributors, the first issue of the Invader Zim comic was the 17th best-selling comic book of July 2015, with approximately 60,000 units sold at North American comic shops in that month alone.

References

External links
 Oni Press

2015 comics debuts
Invader Zim
Comics based on television series
Comics about extraterrestrial life
Black comedy comics
Science fiction comics
American comics
Oni Press titles
Alien invasions in comics
Comics by Jhonen Vasquez